Tall, Dark, and Handsome is a studio album by Delbert McClinton, released in 2019.

The album received a Grammy Award for Best Traditional Blues Album.

Track listing
"Mr. Smith" (Bob Britt, Delbert McClinton, Kevin McKendree)—4:03
"If I Hock My Guitar" (Britt, Michael Joyce, McClinton)—2:07
"No Chicken on the Bone" (Britt, McClinton, Dennis Wage)—3:07
"Let's Get Down Like We Used To" (Al Anderson, McClinton, Pat McLaughlin)—3:03
"Gone to Mexico" (McClinton)—2:16
"Lulu" (Britt, McClinton, McKendree)—3:04
"Loud Mouth" (Britt, Joyce, McClinton)—3:06
"Down in the Mouth" (McClinton)—2:07
"Ruby & Jules" (Britt, McClinton, Wage)—3:00
"Any Other Way" (Britt, McClinton, McKendree)—3:22
"A Fool Like Me" (McClinton)—3:06
"Can't Get Up" (Britt, Joyce, McClinton)—2:35
"Temporarily Insane" (Britt, Joyce, McClinton)—4:04
"A Poem" (Britt, McClinton, McKendree)—1:00

References

2019 albums
Delbert McClinton albums
Grammy Award for Best Traditional Blues Album